Bucculatrix agnella is a species of moth in the  family Bucculatricidae. The species was first described by James Brackenridge Clemens in 1860. It is found in North America, where it has been recorded in Pennsylvania, New Jersey, New York, Washington D.C., Massachusetts, Indiana, Tennessee, Kentucky, Michigan, Missouri, South Dakota, Maine, Ohio and Texas.

The wingspan is about 7 mm. The forewings are white, dusted with pale luteous scales. The markings are formed by oblique streaks of blackish- or fuscous-tipped scales. The hindwings are whitish. Adults have been recorded on wing from April to May and from July to September.

The larvae feed on Ambrosia artemisiifolia. They mine the leaves of their host plant. The mine is very fine and mostly follows the extreme margin of the leaf. Later instars live freely, skeletonizing the leaf and later consuming the entire leaf in irregular patches. Last instar larvae are dark reddish brown. Pupation takes place in a slender, dirty pinkish cocoon.

References

External links
Natural History Museum Lepidoptera generic names catalog

Bucculatricidae
Leaf miners
Moths described in 1860
Taxa named by James Brackenridge Clemens
Moths of North America